Twitchell Airport  (aka Twitchell's Airport/Seaplane Base) in Turner, Maine, United States, was a public, privately owned airport.  It had one asphalt runway, one turf, and Androscoggin River access for water landings. It averaged 98 flights per day, and had approximately 73 aircraft based on its field.

Twitchell Airport had a fixed-base operator (FBO), Dirigo Aerospace Solutions, LLC. It offered major and minor maintenance jobs, fleet maintenance, fuel, hangar space for rent, and a Skyhawk for rent. DAS also supported seaplane operations with 100LL at the seaplane dock and all seaplane maintenance needs.

Twitchell Airport closed November 2022.

External links
 Twitchell's Airport/Seaplane Base website
 Dirigo Aerospace Solutions LLC Facebook page

References

Airports in Androscoggin County, Maine
Turner, Maine